The 2016–17 season is Gabala FK's 12th season, and their 11th in the Azerbaijan Premier League, the top-flight of Azerbaijani football. As well as participating in the Premier League, Gabala will take part in the Azerbaijan Cup and UEFA Europa League.

Transfers

Summer

In:

Out:

Winter

In:

Out:

Released

Squad

Out on loan

Friendlies

Competitions

Azerbaijan Premier League

Results summary

Results

League table

Azerbaijan Cup

Final

UEFA Europa League

Qualifying rounds

Group stage

Squad statistics

Appearances and goals

|-
|colspan="14"|Players away from Gabala on loan:
|-
|colspan="14"|Players who left Gabala during the season:

|}

Goal scorers

Disciplinary record

Notes

References

External links 
Gabala FC Website
Gabala FC at UEFA.com
Gabala FC at Soccerway.com
Gabala FC at National Football Teams.com

Gabala FC seasons
Gabala
Azerbaijani football clubs 2016–17 season